Masjid Manzilgah (lit. Manzilgah Mosque) is a historic structure located in Sukkur, Sindh. It was built by Syed Masoom Shah, the provincial governor, in 1598.

References

Mosques in Sindh
Religious buildings and structures completed in 1598
Tourist attractions in Sukkur
1590s establishments in India